Kimmel Arena is the home of the UNC Asheville Bulldogs basketball programs, both men and women's. It is a 3,200-seat arena located on the campus of the University of North Carolina at Asheville in Asheville, North Carolina. Kimmel Arena, named for local businessman Joe Kimmel, is part of the much larger Wilma M. Sherrill Center, which is a  facility. The arena held its first games, both exhibitions, on November 7, 2011, and formally opened November 13, 2011, as UNC Asheville hosted the University of North Carolina Tar Heels.  It replaces the Justice Center as UNCA's home court, but the latter will remain as a training facility and physical education complex.

Events
Past events include; Bulldog Basketball, the Gala Gymnastics Meet, Colt Ford - music concert, Florida Georgia Line – music concert, the Carolina Day Holiday classic basketball tournament, 2012 Big South Conference men's basketball tournament, American Bridge Club regional tournament, and Gluten Free Food Expo.

See also
 List of NCAA Division I basketball arenas

References

External links
Kimmel Arena Homepage - UNC Asheville Bulldogs

Basketball venues in North Carolina
College basketball venues in the United States
College volleyball venues in the United States
Gymnastics venues in the United States
Indoor arenas in North Carolina
Sports venues in North Carolina
UNC Asheville Bulldogs basketball
Buildings and structures in Asheville, North Carolina
2011 establishments in North Carolina
Sports venues completed in 2011